Georgia's 4th congressional district is a congressional district in the U.S. state of Georgia. The district is currently represented by Democrat Hank Johnson, though the district's boundaries have been redrawn following the 2010 census, which granted an additional congressional seat to Georgia.  The first election using the new district boundaries (listed below) were the 2012 congressional elections.

The newly drawn district retains its majority African American status and includes many of Atlanta's inner eastern suburbs, such as Conyers, Covington, Decatur, Lilburn, and Lithonia. A portion of the City of Snellville (as well as unincorporated areas with the same address) is also included in the district

Counties 
 DeKalb (Partial, see also )
 Newton (Partial, see also )
 Rockdale

Recent results in major elections

List of members representing the district

Election results

2002

2004

2006

2008

2010

2012

2014

2016

2018

2020

2022

See also 
Georgia's congressional districts
List of United States congressional districts
Georgia United States House elections, 2006

Notes

References 
 
 
 Congressional Biographical Directory of the United States 1774–present

External links 
 PDF map of Georgia's 4th district at nationalatlas.gov
 Georgia's 4th district at GovTrack.us

04